Seeff is a surname. Notable people with the surname include:

Lawrence Seeff (born 1959), South African cricketer
Norman Seeff (born 1939), South African photographer and filmmaker

See also
Steff